Pavel Alyaksandravich Nyakhaychyk ((Pavel Aleksandrovich Nekhaychik); born 15 July 1988) is a Belarusian former professional footballer. He played as an attacking midfielder.

Career
After joining FC Tom Tomsk on trial in January 2014, Nyakhaychyk went on to sign a 2.5 year contract with the club in February of the same year. He scored in the 1–1 draw against FC Zenit St. Petersburg in a UEFA Champions League fixture on 21 October 2008.

Honours
BATE Borisov
Belarusian Premier League champion: 2007, 2008, 2009, 2010, 2011, 2013
Belarusian Cup winner: 2009–10, 2019–20, 2020–21
Belarusian Super Cup winner: 2010, 2011, 2013

Dinamo Brest
Belarusian Premier League champion: 2019
Belarusian Cup winner: 2017–18
Belarusian Super Cup winner: 2018, 2019

International career
Nyakhaychyk received his first call-up to the senior team of his country in March 2011 for a Euro 2012 qualifier against Albania and a friendly match versus Canada, but did not make an appearance in these games. His senior side debut came on 10 August 2011 in the 1:0 win against Bulgaria in an exhibition match. Nyakhaychyk was a member of the Belarus U21 that finished in 3rd place at the 2011 UEFA European Under-21 Football Championship. He made 4 appearances, 3 of them as a starter. He has also been capped twice for the Belarus Olympic, scoring one goal in the process.

International goals
Scores and results list Belarus' goal tally first.

References

External links
 
 Nekhaychik's profile on FC BATE's English language website

1988 births
Footballers from Minsk
Living people
Belarusian footballers
Association football midfielders
Belarus international footballers
Belarusian expatriate footballers
Expatriate footballers in Russia
Russian Premier League players
FC BATE Borisov players
FC Dynamo Moscow players
FC Tom Tomsk players
FC Orenburg players
FC Dynamo Brest players